Simon Hébras (born 9 March 1988) is a French professional footballer currently playing for Stade Bordelais as a forward.

Club career
He joined Chamois Niortais in 2002 at the age of fourteen, and made his first-team début for the club in Ligue 2 in the 1–1 draw with Angers on 22 February 2008. Hébras went on to play more than 150 league games for Niort, spanning almost eight seasons.

He scored his first senior goal on 15 August 2009 in the 1–1 draw with Les Herbiers VF in the Championnat de France amateur. In 2014, he spent a loan spell at Championnat National side Luzenac, where he was part of the team that finished as runners-up to champions US Orléans.

In January 2015 Hébras returned to the Championnat National, signing a permanent deal with Le Poiré-sur-Vie.

Career statistics

References

External links
Simon Hébras profile at chamoisniortais.fr

1988 births
Living people
Sportspeople from Poitiers
French footballers
Association football forwards
Chamois Niortais F.C. players
Luzenac AP players
Vendée Poiré-sur-Vie Football players
US Boulogne players
Ligue 2 players
Championnat National players
Footballers from Nouvelle-Aquitaine